is an autobahn in Germany.

The A 659 connects the A 5 Bergstraßenautobahn to Mannheim. Upon the autobahn's completion in the 1960s, the stretch of B 38 along the autobahn's path was replaced, although the B 38 still continues from both of the A 659's termini.

Exit list

Road continues as the B 38 towards Fürth

Road continues as the B 38 into Mannheim
|}

External links
 Autobahn Atlas: A659


659